Vincent Ye Lomboki (born 9 August 1966 in Bron, France) is a former footballer who played 121 matches and scored two goals for Ligue 2 club FC Gueugnon from 1988 to 1992. Born in France, Ye also had six caps for the Burkina Faso national football team between 1996 and 1997, representing the country at the 1996 African Cup of Nations finals.

Career
Ye played club football for several clubs in the lower leagues of French football.

After retiring, he became an assistant manager for French women's football clubs FC Lyon and Olympique Lyonnais (Ladies).

References

External links

CV at OLweb.fr

1966 births
Living people
French footballers
French sportspeople of Burkinabé descent
Sportspeople of Burkinabé descent
Citizens of Burkina Faso through descent
Burkinabé footballers
Burkina Faso international footballers
Footballers from Bordeaux
1996 African Cup of Nations players
FC Gueugnon players
FC Sète 34 players
People from Bron
Association football midfielders
21st-century Burkinabé people
Association football coaches
Sportspeople from Lyon Metropolis
Footballers from Auvergne-Rhône-Alpes
Olympique Lyonnais non-playing staff